Phaudopsis is a genus of moths of the Phaudidae family.

Species
Phaudopsis igneola Hampson, 1900

References

Phaudinae
Zygaenoidea genera